Pennithera is a genus of moths in the family Geometridae.

Species
Pennithera abolla (Inoue, 1943)
Pennithera comis (Butler, 1879)
Pennithera distractata (Sterneck, 1928)
Pennithera djakonovi (Kurentzov, 1950)
Pennithera lugubris Inoue, 1986
Pennithera manifesta Inoue, 1986
Pennithera subalpina Inoue, 1986
Pennithera subcomis Inoue, 1978
Pennithera ulicata (Rambur, 1834)

References
Natural History Museum Lepidoptera genus database

Cidariini